Samuel Adlam Bayntun   was one of two Members of the Parliament of the United Kingdom for the constituency of York from 1830 to 1833.

Life and politics
Samuel was the eldest son of the Rev Henry Bayntun of Bromham, near Devizes in Wiltshire and his mother, Lucy Adlam. He was educated at Westminster School and graduated from Pembroke College, Oxford in 1821. He served in the Army between 1826 and 1832 in the 1st Battalion Dragoon Guards and 1st Battlaion Life Guards achieving the rank of Lieutenant. It was while he stationed in York that he expressed his willingness to stand for election as a Tory. He identified himself as strongly Protestant though his activities in the Commons saw him back more "liberal" policies. He was an advocate for parliamentary reform, reduction in public expenditure and taxation, reform of the Church and amendment to the corn laws.

Money problems with the treasurer of his election committee led him to not be selected to contest re-election in 1833 amid rumours of heavy debt. 

Samuel died in September 1833 of scarlet fever.

References

Members of the Parliament of England for constituencies in Yorkshire
UK MPs 1830–1831
UK MPs 1831–1832
UK MPs 1832–1835
Year of birth missing
Year of death missing